Panteg AFC is a Welsh football club located in Griffithstown, Pontypool, Torfaen, South Wales. The club was founded in 1935 and currently runs two senior teams and one youth team at its home ground, Panteg House Sportsgrounds. The club plays in the Gwent County League Premier Division, tier 4 of the Welsh football pyramid.

History 

Panteg AFC was formed in 1935 under the name Baldwins Panteg (which became RTB Panteg in 1947 following the war), then Panteg in 1969 as a team representing the local Richard Thomas and Baldwin Steelworks (previously Baldwin Steelworks), playing home games at the RTB Sportsground, but in 1981 the grounds were sold to make way for a major road development.  The club then relocated half a mile away to Panteg House Club & Sportsgrounds, where they’ve been ever since.

The team played in the Gwent County League since the 1999–2000 season, following relegation from The Welsh League but have now been promoted back into Welsh League following the 2013–14 season.

Colours and badge 

Panteg AFC's colours are black and white striped shirts, black shorts and black socks. The second strip is all maroon.

The Panteg AFC badge features a Phoenix and a shield featuring the letters "PAFC"

Home ground 

Panteg AFC play their home matches at Panteg House Sportsgrounds. The grounds house the main clubhouse and sports fields of the numerous sports and social clubs based within the grounds.

Committee

Senior squad 2020–21 (provisional)

League positions in previous seasons 

( 1 ) as Baldwins Panteg (a team named Panteg played this season only, and finished 8/8 in the division)
( 2 ) as RTB Panteg
( 3 ) changed name from RTB Panteg to Panteg

Most appearances

References

External links 
 Official site
 http://panteghouse.co.uk/sports.html

Football clubs in Wales
1935 establishments in Wales
Association football clubs established in 1935
Pontypool
Welsh Football League clubs
Ardal Leagues clubs